Crystal Peak is a prominent peak in the Santa Cruz Mountains in southwest Santa Clara County, California, United States. It is the second highest peak in the Santa Cruz Mountains. The headwaters of Llagas Creek originate on the eastern flank of the peak, and flow southward before merging with the Pajaro River at the San Benito County line.

History 
The summit was named for the radio communications facility on the peak and to commemorate early crystal radio development.

See also 
 List of summits of the San Francisco Bay Area

References

External links
 

Mountains of Santa Clara County, California
Mountains of the San Francisco Bay Area
Mountains of Northern California